Hatigaon is a locality in the southern part of Guwahati, Assam, India. It is surrounded by the localities of Ganeshguri, Bhetapara, Sijubari and Survey. The only place in Guwahati where beef meat is sold and available.

Etymology 
It derives its name from Kamrupi, "Hati" (row) and "Gaon" which translates to rows and village, that is "row of villages".

Health facilities
Global Hospital of Surgery, HM Hospital and Medicity Guwahati are some of the prominent healthcare centres located here.

See also
 Pan Bazaar
 Narengi

References

  

Neighbourhoods in Guwahati